Guangnan West Circuit or Guangnan West Province was one of the major circuits during the Song dynasty. Its administrative area corresponds to roughly the modern provinces of Guangxi and Hainan, as well as the western part of Guangdong (Leizhou Peninsula).

Guangnan West Circuit and Guangnan East Circuit were split from Guangnan Circuit in 988.

After the Yuan dynasty was established, most of the Guangnan West Circuit became part of the much larger Huguang province, whose capital was at Wuchang.

See also 

 History of Guangxi
 Lingnan culture

References

 
 

 
Circuits of the Song dynasty
988 establishments
10th-century establishments in China
1278 disestablishments in Asia
13th-century disestablishments in China